The American Health Law Association (AHLA) is a non-profit professional association for attorneys and other professionals in the healthcare field.  Its membership numbers approximately 12,500. The AHLA was created on July 1, 1997, through the merger of the two pre-eminent existing membership associations for health lawyers: the National Health Lawyers Association (NHLA) and the American Academy of Healthcare Attorneys (AAHA) combined into a single organization, AHLA. AHLA is headquartered at 1620 Eye Street NW, Washington, D.C. 20006-4010.

Mission
Its mission is "to provide a collegial forum for interaction and information exchange to enable its members to serve their clients more effectively; to produce the highest quality nonpartisan educational programs, products, and services concerning health law issues; and to serve as a public resource on selected healthcare legal issues."

Formation
The roots of AHLA can be traced back to 1967 when the American Hospital Association (AHA) created a membership association for hospital attorneys to encourage communication and education about  hospital legal issues—the American Society for Hospital Attorneys.

The Society eventually became the American Academy of Healthcare Attorneys (the "Academy")and grew to a membership of 3,300 attorneys, approximately one-third of whom were in-house counsel at hospitals, health plans, and other entities in American health care; attorneys from private law firms and government agencies constituted the balance of the membership .  The Academy sponsored major educational programs and publications, and remained a component of the AHA until it combined with the National Health Lawyers Association in 1997.

The National Health Lawyers Association (NHLA) was formed in 1971 as a nonprofit educational organization whose membership included health attorneys who represented hospitals, physicians, managed care organizations, home health agencies, and long term care facilities.  Over time, the NHLA grew to over 8,500 members, producing educational programs and publications, including the Health Law Digest.

In 1996, leaders of the Academy and NHLA began discussions about merging the two organizations whose missions had grown together as the healthcare landscape changed over time with vertical integration and common issues.  On July 1, 1997, NHLA and the Academy merged, adopting an interim name "NHLA/AAHA."  In 1998, its name was changed to the American Health Lawyers Association. In 2020, the name was changed to American Health Law Association.

References 

Health law in the United States
Law-related professional associations
Health care-related professional associations based in the United States